Waipiro Bay is a small coastal settlement in the Gisborne District on the East Coast of the North Island of New Zealand. The name also refers to the bay that the settlement is built on. It was named Waipiro by Chief Paoa, which translates literally to "putrid water", referring to the area's sulphuric properties. It is in the Waiapu ward, along with nearby towns Te Puia Springs, Tokomaru Bay, and Ruatoria. Waipiro Bay is governed by the Gisborne District Council, and is in the East Coast electorate.

At its peak in the 1900s to 1920s, Waipiro Bay was the largest town on the East Coast, with a population of up to 10,000 people. The town's size greatly diminished after a road was built bypassing the bay in the late 1920s, and as of 2011, there were only about 96 people (20 families) still living there.

During a predetermined season, the Gisborne District Council permits freedom camping in certain areas of the bay, which boasts good surfing, fishing and diving. Te Ara - the Encyclopedia of New Zealand calls Waipiro Bay "one of the most scenic of the coast localities".

History and culture

Early history

The Māori had a settlement at Waipiro Bay, and were whaling from there in the mid-19th century.

For a while, nearby Akuaku was the hub of the area. However, by the late 19th century, Waipiro Bay had become the centre of a farming based community. A post office was built in 1885, and from the 1890s wool bales were being shipped out of the bay, while livestock, supplies, and equipment were being shipped in (usually for J. N. Williams's holdings). There is no harbour at Waipiro Bay, so goods and passengers had to be "surfed" between the shore and waiting ships on surfboats, lighters or rafts.

20th century

In the early 20th century, a road was built to Waipiro Bay. Akuaku did not have a road, so its residents began moving to Waipiro Bay — the new "place to be". Eventually, the main highway north ran through Waipiro Bay, which made it a vital link between Gisborne and the rest of the East Coast. In the 1900s to 1920s, Waipiro Bay became the largest town on the East Coast, with a population of up to 10,000. As the town grew, it became host to the Waiapu County Council offices, a police station, a courthouse, a school, two hotels, a general store and a variety of other stores. Sir Robert Kerridge, founder of Regent Cinemas, established his first cinema in the town, and a maternity hospital was established by the Waiapu Hospital Board in a house originally built for Arthur Beale, J. N. Williams's accountant.

According to Te Ara - the Encyclopedia of New Zealand, a new road was constructed between Te Puia Springs and Kopuaroa in the late 1920s, bypassing the bay. However, according to a former resident of Waipiro Bay, Paora Kahu Carter, this road was not built until after she had moved to the town as a child in 1940. She remembers a thriving town, with a blacksmith, a cinema, a police station, a billiards bar, a hotel, a library, a bakery, a post office, two shops, and the Waipiro Trading Company. Regardless of when the road was built, it had a detrimental effect on the town. With road transport rapidly replacing sea transport, Waipiro Bay became isolated, and the town's shops and services moved to Te Puia Springs. By 2011, Waipiro Bay's population was about 1% of what it was during its peak.

Marae

The local marae, Iritekura Marae, is central to the community, and includes an historic church. It is a meeting place for the Ngāti Porou hapū of Te Whānau a Iritekura, and includes a meeting house of the same name.

Two other historic Ngāti Porou marae are also located north of the Waipiro Bay village: Taharora Marae and meeting house is a meeting place of the hapū of Ngāi Taharora; Kie Kie Marae and Hau meeting house is a meeting place of Te Whānau a Rākairoa and Te Whānau a Te Haemata.

In October 2020, the Government committed $5,756,639 from the Provincial Growth Fund to upgrade Iritekura, Taharora and 27 other Ngāti Porou marae. The funding was expected to create 205 jobs.

Education

Waipiro Bay has a local primary school called Te Kura Kaupapa Maori o Waipiro, a co-ed Māori language immersion school catering for students in Years 1–8. In April 2012 the school had ten students, and a decile rating of two.

References

External links 
 Information about Waipiro Bay in Te Ara - the Encyclopedia of New Zealand's East Coast places story
 Photos of Waipiro Bay on Panoramio
 Historic photos of Waipiro Bay in the Hocken Collections
 Comparison of Waipiro Bay in 1910 and 1996 on the Tarawhiti Museum website

Bays of the Gisborne District
Populated places in the Gisborne District